A warden is a custodian, defender, or guardian. Warden is often used in the sense of a watchman or guardian, as in a prison warden. It can also refer to a chief or head official, as in the Warden of the Mint.

Warden is etymologically identical to guardian, both terms deriving from the Old French garder which in turn is of Germanic origin, wartēn meaning to watch or protect.

Types of wardens include:
 Prison warden, the chief administrative official of a prison
 Warden (college), head of some university colleges and academic institutions in the United Kingdom and Australia
 Warden of the Mint, historical highest-ranking officer of the Royal Mint of the United Kingdom
 Warden, rank of seniority within a City of London livery company 
 Churchwarden, a lay officer in an Anglican or Episcopal church
 Fire warden, a person designated to aid firefighters at a building or community level
 Game warden, an officer empowered to enforce the hunting and trapping laws of a jurisdiction
 Mining warden, presiding officer in a warden's court
 ARP Warden, responsible for enforcing Air Raid Precautions in the United Kingdom during World War II air raids 
 Warden, the chief royal official of a royal forest
 Street warden, an officer aiding police at a community level
 Warden, an officer in a Knights of Columbus council
 Warden, a rank of Masonic lodge officer
 County warden, the head of county governments in Ontario and Nova Scotia, Canada, similar to mayors in cities
 Resident assistant, may be referred to as a warden at some educational institutions
 Park ranger, also called a park warden or forest ranger, a person entrusted with protecting and preserving parklands
 Parking enforcement officer, also called a traffic warden or parking inspector, an officer who issues tickets for parking violations
 Sheltered housing officers, referred to formerly (and still by some) as "wardens"
 Wardens of the Coast
 Lord Warden of the Cinque Ports, a ceremonial office of the Confederation of Cinque Ports of the southeast coast of England
 Lord Warden of the Marches, a historical office in Scotland and England
 Lord Warden of the Stannaries, a historical office in Cornwall
 Warden of the Swans, an office in the Royal Household of the Sovereign of the United Kingdom, created in 1993

References

See also
 Block warden (disambiguation)
 Lord Warden (disambiguation)

Positions of authority